Portkil is a village on the north shore of the Firth of Clyde in Argyll and Bute, Scotland,  and is at the south end of the Rosneath Peninsula.

References

Villages in Argyll and Bute